Paduka Sri Sultan Mahmud Iskandar Shah ibni Almarhum Sultan Muzaffar Shah II (1600-1720) was the eleventh and longest-reigning Sultan of Perak who reigned from 1653 to 1720. He was the son of Sultan Muzaffar Shah II and Raja Putri Fatima Putih, granddaughter of Sultan Abdul Ghafur of Pahang.

Reign and conflict with the Dutch 
After the death of Sultan Muzaffar Shah II in 1653, his son Raja Mahmud was appointed as the 11th Sultan of Perak with the title of Sultan Mahmud Iskandar Shah who resided in Geronggong. Because Sultan Mahmud Iskandar Shah did not have a son, his younger brother Raja Mansur who resided on Pulau Tiga was appointed as Sultan Muda (Crown Prince) and was known as Yang Dipertuan Muda Mansur Shah. Raja Mansur had 6 sons namely Raja Radin, Raja Inu, Raja Bisnu, Raja Daha, Raja Abdul Hamid, and Raja Su. However, Raja Mansur died on Pulau Tiga during the reign of his brother, Sultan Mahmud Iskandar Shah, and received the posthumous name of Marhum Mangkat di Pulau Tiga.

In December 1653, Joan Truijtman came back to Perak and made an agreement. The conditions in the agreement made by Joan Truijtman with the late Sultan Muzaffar Shah II have also been used for this agreement. The agreement talks about the conditions for Perak to give land to the Dutch to build a plant or warehouse for them to do business. The Dutch Company was also given the right to wholesale tin in Perak at a fixed price and tax. The Perak government was also asked to pay all the damages faced by the Dutch when attacked by the Malays in 1651 during the reign of Sultan Muzaffar Shah II.

The agreement made in the year 1653 was not held well by the Perak government which caused the Dutch Company to come back to make a third agreement with Perak where the terms and demands were almost the same as the previous agreement. Although a new agreement has been made, Perak still does not take the agreement seriously. Tin products from Perak have been sent to Aceh instead of being sold to the Dutch. As a result, many Perak people smuggled tin out to sell to other nations.

Due to such things have happened and not following the agreement that had been set, the Dutch finally left their plant in Perak. Among the effects of this, the Dutch began to block the ships of other nations that wanted to come to do business in the states of Perak and Aceh. Not only that, but the Dutch will also confiscate any merchandise from other nations' ships that they find along the waters between Perak and Aceh. This action by the Dutch scared traders from outside to trade in the states of Perak and Aceh.

To end the conflict that occurred between Perak and the Dutch, a peace agreement was made by the Aceh government with the Dutch Company in 1659. After the peace agreement, the Dutch began buying tin in Perak. According to the agreement, only Aceh and the Netherlands are allowed to buy tin products in Perak. However, there are more cases of tin products being smuggled by the people of Perak to merchants of other nations because the purchase price set by the Dutch Company to buy tin products is not profitable.

Once again the Dutch closed their plant in Perak at the end of 1663 because of the hostility and fights that always arose with the Malays in Perak. The Dutch again continued to block merchant ships of other nations that wanted to buy tin metal in Perak. After two years the Dutch plant in Perak was not used, then in 1665, the Dutch Company returned to Perak and opened their plant. The arrival of the Dutch this time caused Perak to be tightly controlled by a force of Dutch warships in the Kuala river of Perak. In 1670, the authorities of the Dutch Company in Batavia ordered the Dutch Company's big men in Malacca to go and take Pangkor Island and build a warehouse made of wood because they were afraid that the island would be taken by the British.

There were several attacks made by the Malays against Dutch ships that were sailing on the seas and rivers of Perak. Therefore, the Dutch increased their control along the coast and rivers of Perak. In 1678, a total of 59 Dutchmen were assigned to guard the sea coast in Perak. Two years later, in February 1680, Sultan Mahmud Iskandar Shah sent his envoys to Malacca to express his friendship with the Dutch Company. Sultan Mahmud Iskandar Shah then granted a power of attorney to a Dutch leader named Adriaen Wylant who lived in the Kuala river in Perak in April 1680 because of the request of the Dutch Governor in Malacca. The power of attorney talks about giving authority to win and imprison anyone who comes out of Perak with tin products without a letter of permission and if the person resists, he can be executed. Also in 1680, most of the Dutch warehouses on Pangkor Island were replaced with stone. The effect of the power of attorney given by Sultan Mahmud Iskandar Shah to the Dutch caused the strict control exercised by the Dutch to control Perak so much so that the Dutch Company's business declined in 1682.

In 1690, a group of Malays led by the commander Kulub came to attack a Dutch city on Pangkor Island. The situation caused many lives of the Dutch to be mortgaged and the city was abandoned by the Dutch until 1745.

At the beginning of the 18th century, Perak was no longer under the control of the Aceh Sultanate. That is because Aceh is getting weaker.

Death 
Sultan Mahmud Iskandar Shah ruled Perak for 67 years. He died in 1720 when he was 120 years old and was buried in Geronggong. Sultan Mahmud Iskandar Shah was the sultan who ruled Perak for the longest time since he was enthroned at the age of 53.

References 

Sultans of Perak
1600 births
1720 deaths
Royal House of Perak
Malay people
People of Malay descent
Muslim monarchs
Sultans
Sunni monarchs
People from Perak